ATLANTIC-ACM is a Boston-based independent research consultancy serving the telecommunications and information technology industries. The firm's primary services focus on business strategy and publications the telecommunications industry's primary sizing and market share studies. The company is best-recognized for its "Excellence" awards, which are derived from annual benchmarking studies.

History and Milestones
ATLANTIC-ACM was founded in 1991 by Judy Reed Smith, a Harvard-educated strategist who tackled her first telecommunications industry project in 1987 and worked for such consultancies as Gray Judson Howard (offshoot of Arthur D. Little) and Mercer Management Consulting.

After generating some of the competitive telecommunications industry's first sizing and share forecasts, Reed Smith was recognized as an industry influencer, based largely on the firm's research become a trusted data source in resources ranging from industry trades to The Wall Street Journal. By 2000, she was recognized within the industry as a "mastermind" and her firm an industry "braintrust".

In 2002, Reed Smith was the first supplier member appointed to the board of directors for the Association of Communications Enterprises (ASCENT), which is now the Internet and Competitive Networks Association (INCOMPAS). In 2009, ATLANTIC-ACM president Fedor Smith became a featured columnist for xchange magazine and later for RCR Wireless News.

Benchmarking and Awards
The company's benchmarking research practice includes annual studies across numerous industry segments at the wholesale and retail levels. Awards derived from that research are promoted by brands that win them in their public relations, marketing and investor relations activities.

References

External links
 

American companies established in 1991
Companies based in Boston